Kelly House or Kelly Residence is located at 2205 East Genesee Street in Syracuse, New York.  It was built in 1923.  Along with other Ward Wellington Ward-designed homes such as the adjacent Collins House, it was listed on the National Register of Historic Places in 1997.

The house features a Mercer tile fireplace with tiles depicting 12 trades, and built-in bookcases.

The house fronts on East Genesee Street, but is on an L-shaped lot which provides access to Allen Street as well.  The Collins House is at the corner of the two streets.

References

Houses in Syracuse, New York
National Register of Historic Places in Syracuse, New York
Houses on the National Register of Historic Places in New York (state)
Houses completed in 1923